Karma Kamaleón is the fifth album by Mexican iconic pop singer Yuri. It was released in 1984. This album received Platinum and Gold discs because of its sales over 700000 copies . The title track is a Spanish language version of the hit by Culture Club, Karma Chameleon.

Track listing Latin America Edition

Track listing Spain Edition
Ni tu, ni yo

Production
 Producer: Rafael Trabucchelli
 Musical arrangements: Rafael Trabucchelli
 Country of recording: Spain

Singles
 "Karma Kamaleon"
 "No sé que tienes tú"
 "No se que pasa" (Only in Spain)
 "Ciao, cariño, ciao"

1984 albums
Yuri (Mexican singer) albums